Cyclin-dependent kinase inhibitor 1C (p57, Kip2), also known as CDKN1C, is a protein which in humans is encoded by the CDKN1C  imprinted gene.

Function 

Cyclin-dependent kinase inhibitor 1C is a tight-binding inhibitor of several G1 cyclin/Cdk complexes and a negative regulator of cell proliferation.  Mutations of CDKN1C are implicated in sporadic cancers and Beckwith-Wiedemann syndrome suggesting that it is a tumor suppressor candidate.

CDKN1C is a tumor suppressor human gene on chromosome 11 (11p15) and belongs to the cip/kip gene family. It encodes a cell cycle inhibitor that binds to G1 cyclin-CDK complexes. Thus p57KIP2 causes arrest of the cell cycle in G1 phase.

CDKN1C was found to lead to cancer cell dormancy; its gene expression is regulated through the activity of glucocorticoid receptors (GRs) through chromatin remodelling mediated by SWI/SNF.

Clinical significance 

A mutation of this gene may lead to loss of control over the cell cycle leading to uncontrolled cellular proliferation. p57KIP2 has been associated with Beckwith-Wiedemann syndrome (BWS) which is characterized by increased risk of tumor formation in childhood. Loss-of-function mutations in this gene have also been shown associated to the IMAGe syndrome (Intrauterine growth restriction, Metaphyseal dysplasia, Adrenal hypoplasia congenita, and Genital anomalies).  Complete hydatidiform moles consist only of paternal DNA, and thus the cells lack p57 expression as the gene is paternally imprinted (silenced). Immuohistochemical stains for p57 can aid with the diagnosis of hydatidiform moles.

Interactions 

Cyclin-dependent kinase inhibitor 1C has been shown to interact with:
 LIMK1,
 MYBL2, 
 MyoD,  and
 PCNA.

References

Further reading

External links 
  GeneReviews/NIH/NCBI/UW entry on Beckwith-Wiedemann Syndrome
 
 

Cell cycle
Tumor suppressor genes